Siddheshwar Dam is an earth-fill dam on Purna River, which is a tributary of River Godavari. This dam is located in the north-western part of Aundha Nagnath, in the Hingoli district of Maharashtra, India.

The dam was constructed in the era of Yashwantrao Chavan, the former chief minister of Maharashtra State. The dam serves the purpose of irrigation for Aundha Nagnath and Basmath tehsils of Hingoli. It also provides drinking water to nearby cities such as Nanded and Basmath.

The proposed site for Light Interferometer Gravitational Observatory (LIGO-India) is nearly 6 km away from the dam.

Specifications
It is also known as Rupur camp.

Purpose
 Irrigation

See also
 Dams in Maharashtra
 Godavari River Basin Irrigation Projects
 List of reservoirs and dams in India

References

Dams in Hingoli district
Dams completed in 1968
1968 establishments in Maharashtra